Dan-I (born Selmore Ezekiel Lewinson; July 1956 – 19 May 2006) was a British disco musician, signed to Island Records, who had a Top 30 hit in the UK Singles Chart in 1979 with a single called "Monkey Chop,” which later climbed to number 11 on “Top of the Pops” in Sweden by March 1980 and in the Top Ten in Milan, Italy and in New Zealand. He originated from Clarendon, Jamaica. Without any further chart success, Dan-I remains listed as a one-hit wonder, although he continued to release several albums as a solo artist under independent record labels and as lead singer for various other bands, most notably the L.A.-based gospel reggae band, Unity, in the 1980s.

Career and background
His stage name derived from his interest in numerology, meaning "number one". In the early 1970s he was asked by George Clinton to join his band Funkadelic, but he declined, believing he was too young. During the 1970s he worked with Cat Stevens, Andy Fraser, and Joe Jammer, and led his own club band, D-Dancer. D-Dancer split up in 1976, after which Dan-I spent a year in Nigeria before embarking on a solo career, signing with Island Records after being introduced by Linton Kwesi Johnson, and having a major hit with "Monkey Chop", which he described as "music for the new optimism". The song was produced by Trevor Horn and Geoff Downes.

He moved to Los Angeles, California in the mid-1980s, where he recorded several demos.   During the 1980s, he helped found The Unity Gospel Band. He was also connected with a release by Unity, For The Glory Of Jah. He provided the lead vocals for the release. He provided backing vocals for Busta Jones's 1988 single, "My Hands Are Shakin'".

He then moved to South Africa before returning to London.

UK discography (unless stated otherwise)

References

External links
 Dan I - "Monkey Chop" at discogs.com
 
 Listen to some of Dan-I's music
 HIT FM TV - Dan-I - Monkey Chop
 Belize Music World: Selmore Ezekiel Linford Lewinson

2006 deaths
English people of Jamaican descent
British reggae musicians
British disco musicians
1951 births
Island Records artists